Ahmad Boestamam (30 November 1920 – 19 January 1983), or Abdullah Sani, was a Malaysian freedom fighter, politician and was the founding president of Parti Rakyat Malaysia and Parti Marhaen Malaysia.

Ahmad Boestamam was born in Setapak, Ampang, Kuala Lumpur (then in the undivided state of Selangor) to ethnic Malay parents of Minangkabau origin who originally come from Tanah Datar, West Sumatra, Indonesia and was raised in Tanjung Malim, Perak.

Biography
Boestamam had been a young follower of the Kesatuan Melayu Muda (KMM) from the late 1930s in Perak, emerging after the war as the militant youth leader of Angkatan Pemuda Insaf (API) to the older and more moderate Dr Burhanuddin al-Helmy and Ishak Haji Muhammad (Pak Sako) of the Malay Nationalist Party (PKMM).

PKMM, in turn, led Pusat Tenaga Rakyat or Putera to join the All Malayan Council of Joint Action (AMCJA), which was then led by the Malayan Democratic Union (MDU). AMCJA crafted the People's Constitution in 1947 as the basis for Malayan independence, years before the United Malays National Organisation switched its slogan from "Hidup Melayu" to "Merdeka" under Tunku Abdul Rahman’s leadership.

Boestamam was detained without trial for seven long years from early 1948, before the Malayan Emergency was declared in mid-1948, together with thousands of other Malay youths demanding independence. This pre-emptive repression by the colonial power was to ethnically colour the subsequent anti-colonial resistance.

Soon after his release in 1955, he set up the Partai Rakyat Malaya with other independent fighters on 11 November 1955. Inspired by the anti-colonial and socialist struggle in Indonesia led by Sukarno, the party in its formative years subscribe to a Pan-Malay/Indonesia nationalism. Unlike its contemporary UMNO (which later became the ruling party until 2018), Parti Rakyat demanded total independence from British colonialism.

The party later joined with the Labour Party of Malaya (Parti Buruh), chaired by Ishak Haji Muhammad, to create the Socialist Front, which dominated the local councils in Peninsular Malaysia. The growing power of the left resulted in a heavy crackdown by the UMNO government.

In 1963, soon after the outbreak of the Konfrontasi between Malaysia and Indonesia, the Alliance government began yet another massive round-up of politicians and activists among the opposition. Among those arrested and detained were Boestamam, Ishak Haji Muhammad, Abdul Aziz Ishak (head of GERAM), Datuk Kampo Radjo (later the president of PRM), Tan Kai Hee, Tan Hock Hin, Dr. M.K. Rajakumar, Hasnul Hadi, Tajuddin Kahar and hundreds of others.

The Socialist Front eventually dissolved under strong state repression and local council elections were abolished. 

Parti Rakyat became a fringe party in parliamentary politics and following his release from detention, Boestamam was then removed as party leader by a group led by Kassim Ahmad.

He and Ishak Haji Muhammad established Parti Marhaen Malaysia in 1968 and attempted to re-establish the Socialist Front before the 1974 elections, but failed. Boestaman eventually faded from the headlines of Malaysian politics.

Boestamam's son, Rustam Sani would later become the deputy president of the party his father founded.

Ahmad Boestaman died on 19 January 1983.

References

External links 
 Farewell to a true Malaysian, The Star, 26 April 2008.

1920 births
1983 deaths
People from Perak
Malaysian people of Malay descent
Malaysian Muslims
Malaysian people of Minangkabau descent
Malaysian people of Indonesian descent
Place of birth missing
Place of death missing
Parti Rakyat Malaysia politicians
Parti Marhaen Malaysia politicians
Malaysian Social Justice Party politicians
Malaysian political party founders
Malaysian socialists